Noel Stagg (born 1968) is hurling and football player. He resides in Hollymount in Mayo, Ireland.

Achievements
Captained the Mayo hurling team.
2 All-Ireland Titles with Mayo Masters.
4 Mayo County Senior Championships with Hollymount.
Captained Saint Colmans College hurling Team.
 Current selector of Hollymount team along with other former Hollymount legend Jarlath Jennings

Personal life
He is married and has a son Ian and daughter Amy.

References

1968 births
Living people
Dual players
Mayo inter-county hurlers
Hollymount Carramore Gaelic footballers
Hollymount Carramore hurlers
Sportspeople from County Mayo